The Type 72 is a Chinese metal-cased circular anti-tank blast mine, it is similar to the Russian TM-46 mine, a plastic cased version of the mine is also produced, the Type 72 non-metallic anti-tank mine. The mine has a central plastic cased blast resistant fuze.

Specifications
 Weight: 8 kg
 Explosive content: 5 kg of TNT (explosive)/RDX
 Diameter: 279 mm
 Height: 93 mm
 Operating pressure: 300 to 370 kg

Anti-tank mines